The women's 100 metres hurdles event at the 1987 Summer Universiade was held at the Stadion Maksimir in Zagreb on 15 and 16 July 1987.

Medalists

Results

Heats
Held on 15 July

Wind:Heat 1: -2.2 m/s, Heat 2: -0.5 m/s, Heat 3: -0.9 m/s, Heat 4: ? m/s

Semifinals
Held on 16 July

Wind:Heat 1: -0.3 m/s, Heat 2: 0.0 m/s, Heat 3: -0.9 m/s, Heat 4: ? m/s

Final
Held on 16 July

Wind: +1.5 m/s

References

Athletics at the 1987 Summer Universiade
1987